Yatonmilk (YTNMLK, Romanized also as Yatanmilk, Yaton Milk, Yatan-Milk)  was a Phoenician King of Sidon and a vassal to the Achaemenid king of kings Darius I ( 515–486 BC).

Epigraphic sources 
Yatonmilk's name was attested on many building stone-incised dedications dubbed the Bodashtart inscriptions that were found at the Temple of Eshmun in the hinterland of the city of Sidon in Lebanon. Despite being mentioned in the inscriptions, nothing is known about his reign due to the lack of further material or epigraphic evidence.

Bodashtart, Yatonmilk's father who is dubbed the 'builder king', carried out an extensive expansion and restoration project of the Temple of Eshmun; he left more than thirty dedicatory inscriptions at the temple site. The first phase of the works involved adding a second podium at the base of the temple. During this construction phase inscriptions were carved on the added podium's foundation stones around 530 BC, these inscriptions known as KAI 15, do not mention Yatonmilk. A second set of inscriptions (KAI 16) were placed on restoration ashlar stones; these stones mention Yatonmilk and emphasize his legitimacy as heir, associate him with the reign of his father, and assign a share of credit to Yatonmilk for the construction project. One example of the Bodashtart's inscriptions reads: "The king Bodashtart and his legitimate heir Yatonmilk, king of the Sidonians, grandson of king Eshmunazar, king of the Sidonians, built this temple to his god Eshmun, the Sacred Prince". Another translation reads: "King Bodashtort, and his pious son (or legitimate successor), Yatonmilk, king of the Sidonians, descendants (bn bn) of King Eshmunazor, king of the Sidonians, this house he built to his god, to Eshmun, lord/god of the sanctuary."

Some scholars misidentified Yatonmilk as the father of Bodashtart; this was successfully contested by later epigraphists.

Etymology 
The Latinized form Yatonmilk comes from the Phoenician 𐤉𐤕𐤍𐤌𐤋𐤊‎ (YTNMLK), meaning "the king gives" from  𐤉𐤕𐤍 (Yaton, "to give") and 𐤌𐤋𐤊 (Milk, "king"). Marvin Pope posited that the epithet mlk may be an abbreviation of the name of the Phoenician god Melkart (melk-qart) which means the king of the city.

Notes

References

Bibliography

Kings of Sidon
6th-century BC rulers
6th-century BC Phoenician people
Rulers in the Achaemenid Empire